Thamesmead  is an area of south-east London, England, straddling the border between the Royal Borough of Greenwich and the London Borough of Bexley. It mainly consists of social housing built from the mid-1960s onwards on former marshland on the south bank of the River Thames.

History

Military use 

There is some evidence of prehistoric human occupation of the area: flints, animal bones and charcoal were found in bore holes around Western and Central Way in 1997 by the Museum of London Archaeological Service (MOLAS). In Roman times, the river level was significantly lower, and work by MOLAS in 1997 around Summerton Way revealed evidence of field ditches and pottery and quernstones from Germany dating from around the 3rd or 4th century. After the Roman era, river levels rose again and the area reverted to marshland. According to Hasted, some areas of this marshland were drained by 1279 by the monks of Lesnes Abbey.

Between 1812 and 1816, a canal was built by convicts to take materials such as timber from the River Thames to Woolwich Royal Arsenal. Much of this canal has been filled in, but part remains in Thamesmead West and is now called the Broadwater. A disused lock gate and swing bridge over the canal still exist beside the River Thames.

Original concept 
Thamesmead as it is now was built at the end of the 1960s. Efforts were made to solve the social problems that had already started to affect earlier estates. These were believed to be the result of people being uprooted from close-knit working-class communities and sent to estates many miles away, where they did not know anybody. The design of the  new estates meant that people would feel more isolated than they would have done in the terraced housing that had been typical in working-class areas. The solution proposed was that once the initial residents had moved in, their families would be given priority for new housing when it became available.

Another radical idea of the GLC division architect Robert Rigg was taken from housing complexes in Sweden, where it was believed that lakes and canals reduced vandalism and other crime, mainly among the young. He used water as a calming influence on the residents.

Thamesmead was designed around futuristic ideas, and indeed, looked impressive at first from a distance. It  provided walkways between its blocks of homes and later between sections in North Thamesmead. The walkways quickly became littered and abused. They were not considered safe places to walk. Pathways set out for people to walk on were put in without regard to how people would wish to get about, so some were ignored in favour of more direct routes over grassed areas.

Much of Thamesmead was initially built by the Greater London Council (GLC) for rent to families moving from overcrowded back-to-back Victorian housing (also referred to as slums) in south eastern parts of Inner London. The area had been inundated in the Flood of 1953, so the original design placed living accommodation at first floor level or above, used overhead walkways and left the ground level of buildings as garage space. There is also an elevated 'escape route' from the estate to be used in the event of flooding, which runs along the top of a grassed mound to the north of Lesnes neighbourhood.

The first residence was occupied in 1968, but already there were rain penetration problems. The pre-1974 parts of Thamesmead are a mix of modernist town houses, medium-rise and 12-storey blocks system-built in concrete, which have featured in various films due to their 'rough urban look'; the design of the newer buildings is more traditional and in brick.

When the GLC was abolished in 1986, its housing assets and the remaining undeveloped land were vested in a non-profit organisation, Thamesmead Town Limited (TTL). TTL was a private company with an unusual form of governance. Its nine executive directors were local residents; they periodically submitted themselves to re-election. Subsequently six additional paid directors who did not live in the area were appointed.

Problems of the original design 
Despite early proposals for the Jubilee Line Extension to go to Thamesmead, via the Isle of Dogs and the Royal Docks, Thamesmead was not included and after reaching the Greenwich Peninsula, the line heads north to Stratford (via Canning Town and West Ham), despite Stratford also being on the major Central line tube link into London. The main reason cited for this decision was that many workers in Canary Wharf lived in Essex and could change from National Rail to the Jubilee line at Stratford and West Ham.

Thamesmead is also cut off from the north of the River Thames and is in the centre of the  gap between the Blackwall Tunnel and the Dartford Tunnel/QE2 Bridge. Various proposals have been made for a new river crossing, the closest of which was in the late 1980s, when there was a controversial proposal to alter the shape of London's South Circular inner orbital road to run through Oxleas Woods. Houses in Plumstead were compulsorily purchased but the plans fell through. Since then, Thamesmead has grown significantly, limiting the number of potential sites for a new river crossing.

The most significant design failure was the almost complete lack of shopping facilities and banks: only a few "corner shops" were initially built at Tavy Bridge. From the start Thamesmead was cut off from Abbey Wood, the nearest town with shopping facilities, by a railway line; however a four-lane road bridge was built over the railway in the early 1970s. The area was then cut in two by the A2016, a new four-lane dual carriageway by-pass of the Woolwich to Erith section of the A206 (although this road only got as far as the industrial part of lower Belvedere: the extension to Erith was opened in 1999). Still, residential building continued, this time on the other side of the A2016, which cut this part of Thamesmead off from rail travel to central London.

Over time more facilities developed, with a Morrisons supermarket and retail park near Gallions Reach. Bus services were improved and residents can now easily reach Abbey Wood railway station.

21st century 
In 2000, TTL was wound down and two new organisations were formed. In broad terms, Gallions Housing Association took over the ownership and management of the housing assets whilst Tilfen, later Tilfen Land, took over the remaining undeveloped land. Tilfen is jointly owned by Gallions and Trust Thamesmead.

District heating and cable radio broadcasting were pioneered in Thamesmead. The District heating system was decommissioned around 2000; properties connected to it had wet radiator systems installed by the landlord.

The Tavy Bridge area is now being redeveloped by Gallions in partnership with Wates Group; the plans include homes with dwelling space at ground-floor level, making them susceptible to any future flooding.

Thamesmead now features a retail park finished in brick anchored around a Morrisons Supermarket; there is also a shopping parade which has mainly service-based outlets such as hairdressers and estate agents. It features a clock tower and lake. Some of the original overhead pedestrian walkways have been demolished for reasons of public safety and some ground-floor garages have been unfilled, as incidents of crime deterred their use as parking space.

Trust Thamesmead is a registered charity set up to provide community services across Thamesmead. It runs six community centres and a variety of projects promoting social development and work and training projects.

Thamesmead West contains Gallions Ecopark a pioneering small social/affordable housing development with homes built to high energy efficiency and environmental standards. The estate also includes a small lake and a number of man-made landmarks created from recycled excavated material that serve as viewing platforms.

Part of Thamesmead West is also sometimes referred to as Gallions Reach Urban Village. This can lead to confusion, as it is on the opposite bank of the River Thames from Gallions Reach DLR station and Gallions Reach shopping park. There is no Docklands Light Railway, London Underground or rail station in Thamesmead West.

Early 21st century new build properties in Thamesmead West have been blighted by social problems and mass repossessions, attracting national attention. Housing is still under construction both by Gallions Housing Association (for rent and part rent/part buy) and by private developers (for outright sale). Another new development is under construction in 2010. The final phase of the Gallions Reach Urban Village (ecopark) is the creation of Gallions Reach Park, a  public open space land, between Gallions Hill and the River Thames. Water remains an important feature of the several parks and open spaces.

In November 2007, Bexley Council marked Thamesmead's 40th birthday with a motion proposed by local Councillor David Leaf and seconded by Councillor John Davey.

In 2014, Gallions, Tilfen Land and Trust Thamesmead were taken over by Peabody Trust, a London housing association. In 2015, two Housing Zones in Thamesmead were announced by the Mayor of London for delivery of 2,800 homes. The zones are Abbey Wood and South Thamesmead, between Abbey Wood station and Southmere Lake, and Abbey Wood, Plumstead and Thamesmead. Peabody said in 2018 that it will deliver 20,000 new homes, increasing the number of residents to around 80,000.

While a railway extension from Barking Riverside was mooted for several years, Transport for London secured funding in 2020 for a potential Docklands Light Railway extension to Thamesmead on the network's branch to Beckton.

Geography 
Thamesmead is located 11 miles (18 km) east of central London, being on the same latitude as Westminster. In Thamesmead East, the River Thames makes its most northerly incursion within Greater London near the Crossness Sewage Treatment Works.

Areas 

Thamesmead consists of four distinct areas:
 Thamesmead South is in Bexley and is the location of the original development built in the late 1960s to early 1970s. The buildings are almost entirely of concrete, in a Cubist/Brutalist/Modernist style, and include a number of high-rise blocks. It is east of Harrow Manor Way (A2041) and south of the A2016. Postcode(s): SE2, DA18
 Thamesmead North is in Greenwich and Bexley and is north of the A2016 and east of the A2041. Built from the 1970s onwards, it was initially made up of town houses in grey brick; more recent builds are in red & yellow brick. Postcode(s): SE2, SE28
 Thamesmead Central is in Greenwich and was first developed in the early 1980s in the ring between the A2016 and A2041. It originally consisted of large, sprawling, concrete and red brick, eight- and nine-storey estates overlooking the A2041, and three-storey red-brick town houses. It has spread west of the A2041 and now also includes a number of red and yellow brick homes built from the 1990s onwards. Postcode(s): SE28
 Thamesmead West (also known as Broadwater Green) is in Greenwich near Woolwich and Plumstead (Between Whinchat Road, the A2016 & the banks of the river Thames) and was built from the 1990s onwards. It is a significant distance from the original development and consists mainly of medium density residential development with yellow brick fascias, with towers along the riverside. Postcode(s): SE28

Belmarsh Prison, Isis Prison and Thameside Prison are located on the western edge of the area, while the sewage processing works at Crossness, built in the Victorian era is on eastern edge of Thamesmead. The southern boundary is the covered Southern Outfall Sewer, which has been landscaped as an elevated footpath called the Ridgeway.

Neighbouring areas 
Nearby areas are: Barking & Dagenham (across the Thames), Belvedere, Abbey Wood, Plumstead, Welling, Woolwich, Bexleyheath, Erith and Greenwich.

Demography 

Thamesmead's population is increasing rapidly as new developments are being built in the area. Based on mid-2018 estimates, the area's population has reached to 41,121, an increase of almost 30% in seven years over the 2011 figure of 31,824. Because of this, there is an increasing level of demand for the proposed DLR extension from Gallions Reach.

In common with the rest of London, the ethnic make-up of Thamesmead has changed since it was first built. Initially, it was one of the most homogenous estates of its type in London, being predominately white and working class. The lack of London Underground services and at the very edge of the metropolis may have meant Thamesmead was not first port of call for immigrants arriving in London. The housing selection policy that favoured relatives of existing residents reinforced this aspect.

However, after the Fall of Saigon and the American withdrawal from Vietnam in the late 1970s, a small group of Vietnamese refugees built a community in the area. In the 1990s, another ultimately larger wave of emigration from West Africa (predominately Nigeria and Ghana) began. The 2011 census revealed that 35.58% of residents in the Thamesmead Moorings ward described themselves as Black African, the highest percentage in both London and the UK; Thamesmead East had the second highest at 34.88%.

Thamesmead also adjoins the Thistlebrook travellers site which is situated just inside Abbey Wood.

Thamesmead Moorings; Ethnicity Breakdown:

Black or Black British 42.9%
Black African 35.6%
Black Caribbean 3.8%
Black Other 3.5%

White 42.4%
White British 33.3%
White Irish 0.7%
White Gypsy or Irish Traveller 0.3%
White Other: 8.1%

Asian or Asian British 7.8%
Indian 1.5%
Bangladeshi 0.7%
Pakistani 0.7%
Chinese 2.2%
Other Asian 2.7%

Mixed Race 5.3%
White and Black Caribbean 1.7%
White and Black African 1.8%
White and Asian 0.6%
Mixed Other 1.2%

Other Ethnic Groups 1.7%
Arab 0.3%
Other 1.4%

Crime 

Some estate residents claim that gangs have been left untouched by police.

Transport 

Thamesmead's location between the Thames and the South London escarpment (see North Downs) makes it difficult to build new road and railway infrastructure. As a result, Thamesmead has no underground or above-ground rail lines. Most residents travel by bus to the nearest rail stations. There is, however, a disused railway trackbed from Plumstead which originally served the Royal Arsenal. The London Assembly proposed on 4 October 2016 to build an extension of the DLR from Gallions Reach to Thamesmead. With a population of almost 32,000, it is one of the largest districts in Greater London with no railway infrastructure.

Buses 
Many bus routes serve the area, all provided by Transport for London.

National Rail 
The nearest stations are Abbey Wood, Belvedere, Plumstead and Woolwich Arsenal for Southeastern and services towards Crayford, Dartford, London Cannon Street, London Charing Cross, Elizabeth line services to Paddington and Thameslink services towards Rainham via Dartford and Luton via Blackfriars.

Cycle paths 
The Ridgeway cycle path, owned by Thames Water, passes through the town from Plumstead Railway station to Crossness Sewage Treatment works, dividing the town into North and South Thamesmead.

Culture 
There are a wide variety of active community groups and local bands (The Bargains and a member of post-rock act From The Sky) and a short-range commercial radio station - 106.8 Time FM - that grew from the original cable (subsequently FM) service "Radio Thamesmead".

Places of worship in the area include the Thamesmead Ecumenical Parish, with shared buildings and co-operation by the Methodist Church, Church of England, United Reformed Church and Roman Catholic Church, and the Redeemed Christian Church of God, Goodnews Haven on Nathan Way.

Sport and leisure 
The local football team was Thamesmead Town F.C. who played at the Bayliss Avenue ground. Thamesmead were champions of the Kent League in 2007–08, and were then promoted to the Isthmian League Division One North. Thamesmead Town folded in October 2018.

The Thamesmead Riverside Walk runs alongside the Thames through Thamesmead West, Thamesmead Central and Thamesmead North and is part of both the Thames Path Southeast Extension and National Cycle Route 1. Thamesmead is also one of the starting points of the Green Chain Walk, which links to places such as Chislehurst and Crystal Palace.

There is a combined swimming pool, fitness centre and library run by Greenwich Council and Greenwich Leisure Limited in Thamesmead Central (The Thamesmere Centre). Bexley Council run a library at Binsey Walk near Southmere Lake, and sailing and canoeing are run at Southmere Lake in Thamesmead South by Southmere Boating Centre (with Greenwich Yacht Club) and sailing only by the YMCA in association with Erith Yacht Club. Trust Thamesmead run an indoor climbing wall (The cave) near Southmere Lake. The Thamesview Golf Centre in Thamesmead North has a nine-hole course and driving range. Fishing at Birchmere Lake in Thamesmead West is organised by Thamesmead Town Angling Club. Fish include tench, bream, carp and pike.

Cultural references 
Thamesmead estate was featured prominently in the film The Optimists of Nine Elms (1973) starring Peter Sellers. Thamesmead is seen as a new and better alternative through the eyes of two small children who live in older, dilapidated flats in Nine Elms, Battersea. The Tavy Bridge area of Thamesmead South, including Southmere Lake, was used as a setting for the Stanley Kubrick film A Clockwork Orange and also the play and Channel 4 gay coming-of-age film Beautiful Thing. The British TV drama Misfits was also filmed in Thamesmead. Many scenes take place around Southmere Lake, while Bexley College was once also used as a setting.
The estate featured in The Libertines video What Became of the Likely Lads.
The video of "Come to Daddy" by electronic musician Aphex Twin, directed by Chris Cunningham, was also shot in Thamesmead. The Firm (1989), starring Gary Oldman, was filmed in Thamesmead. The music video for New York rapper A$AP Rocky's and London rapper Skepta's song "Praise the Lord (Da Shine)" was partially filmed at the Thamesmead Estate, with the estate featuring prominently alongside shots of New York throughout the music video.

See also 
List of schools in Bexley
List of schools in Greenwich

References

External links 

 Description from the Hidden London website
 Public online community and history group

Areas of London
Housing estates in the Royal Borough of Greenwich
Districts of London on the River Thames
Districts of the Royal Borough of Greenwich
Districts of the London Borough of Bexley
District centres of London